The Rural Municipality of Monet No. 257 is a rural municipality (RM) in the Canadian province of Saskatchewan within Census Division No. 8 and  Division No. 3. It is located in the southwest portion of the province.

History 
The RM of Monet No. 257 incorporated as a rural municipality on December 13, 1909.

Geography

Communities and localities 
The following urban municipalities are surrounded by the RM.

Towns
Elrose

The following unincorporated communities are within the RM.

Localities
Chipperfield
Forgan
Greenan
Gunnworth
Hughton
Lille
Wartime

Demographics 

Attractions 
There is a historical site, a regional park, and a museum located within the RM.
Hughton Medicine Wheel, in Hughton: an archeological site consisting of a central cairn, radiating walkways.
Elrose Brick School Museum
Elrose Regional Park

Government 
The RM of Monet No. 257 is governed by an elected municipal council and an appointed administrator that meets on the second Thursday of every month. The reeve of the RM is Duncan Campbell while its administrator is Meghan Nickason. The RM's office is located in Elrose.

Transportation 
 Saskatchewan Highway 4
 Saskatchewan Highway 44
 Saskatchewan Highway 664
 Saskatchewan Highway 751
 Saskatchewan Highway 752
 Canadian National Railway

See also 
List of rural municipalities in Saskatchewan

References 

M